Pan-Slavism, a movement which crystallized in the mid-19th century, is the political ideology concerned with the advancement of integrity and unity for the Slavic people. Its main impact occurred in the Balkans, where non-Slavic empires had ruled the South Slavs for centuries. These were mainly the Byzantine Empire, Austria-Hungary, the Ottoman Empire, and Venice.

Origins 
Extensive pan-Slavism began much like Pan-Germanism: both these movements flourished from the sense of unity and nationalism experienced within ethnic groups after the French Revolution and the consequent Napoleonic Wars against traditional European monarchies. As in other Romantic nationalist movements, Slavic intellectuals and scholars in the developing fields of history, philology, and folklore actively encouraged Slavs' interest in their shared identity and ancestry. Pan-Slavism co-existed with the Southern Slavic drive towards independence.

Commonly used symbols of the Pan-Slavic movement were the Pan-Slavic colours (blue, white and red) and the Pan-Slavic anthem, Hey, Slavs.

The first pan-Slavists were the 16th-century Croatian writer Vinko Pribojević, the Dalmatian Aleksandar Komulović (1548–1608), the Croat Bartol Kašić (1575–1650), the Ragusan Ivan Gundulić (1589–1638) and the Croatian  Catholic missionary Juraj Križanić ( – 1683). Scholars such as Tomasz Kamusella have attributed early manifestations of Pan-Slavic thought within the Habsburg monarchy to the Slovaks Adam Franz Kollár (1718–1783) and Pavel Jozef Šafárik (1795–1861).
The Pan-Slavism movement grew rapidly following the end of the Napoleonic Wars in 1815. In the aftermath of the wars, the leaders of Europe sought to restore the pre-war status quo. At the Congress of Vienna of 1814–1815, Austria's representative, Prince von Metternich, detected a threat to this status quo in the Austrian Empire through nationalists' demands for independence from the empire.
While Vienna's subjects included numerous ethnic groups (such as Germans, Italians, Romanians, Hungarians, etc.), the Slav proportion of the population (Poles, Ruthenians, Ukrainians, Czechs, Slovaks, Slovenes, Serbs and Croats) together formed a substantial—if not the largest—ethnic grouping.

First Pan-Slav Congress, Prague, 1848 

The First Pan-Slav congress was held in Prague, Bohemia, in June 1848, during the revolutionary movement of 1848. The Czechs had refused to send representatives to the Frankfurt Assembly feeling that Slavs had a distinct interest from the Germans. The Austroslav, František Palacký, presided over the event. Most of the delegates were Czech and Slovak. Palacký called for the co-operation of the Habsburgs and had also endorsed the Habsburg monarchy as the political formation most likely to protect the peoples of central Europe. When the Germans asked him to declare himself in favour of their desire for national unity, he replied that he would not as this would weaken the Habsburg state: “Truly, if it were not that Austria had long existed, it would be necessary, in the interest of Europe, in the interest of humanity itself, to create it.”

The Pan-Slav congress met during the revolutionary turmoil of 1848. Young inhabitants of Prague had taken to the streets and in the confrontation, a stray bullet had killed the wife of Field Marshal Alfred I, Prince of Windisch-Grätz, the commander of the Austrian forces in Prague. Enraged, Windischgrätz seized the city, disbanded the congress, and established martial law throughout Bohemia.

Pan-Slavism in the Czech lands and Slovakia 

The first Pan-Slavic convention was held in Prague on June 2 through 16, 1848. The delegates at the Congress were specifically both anti-Austrian and anti-Russian. Still "the Right"—the moderately liberal wing of the Congress—under the leadership of František Palacký (1798–1876), a Czech historian and politician, and Pavol Jozef Šafárik (1795–1861), a Slovak philologist, historian and archaeologist, favored autonomy of the Slav lands within the framework of Austrian (Habsburg) monarchy. In contrast "the Left"—the radical wing of the Congress—under the leadership of Karel Sabina (1813–1877), a Czech writer and journalist, Josef Václav Frič, a Czech nationalist, Karol Libelt (1817–1861), a Polish writer and politician, and others, pressed for a close alliance with the revolutionary-democratic movement going on in Germany and Hungary in 1848.

A national rebirth in the Hungarian "Upper Land" (now Slovakia) awoke in a completely new light, both before the Slovak Uprising in 1848 and after. The driving force of this rebirth movement were Slovak writers and politicians who called themselves Štúrovci, the followers of Ľudovít Štúr. As the Slovak nobility was Magyarized and most Slovaks were merely farmers or priests, this movement failed to attract much attention. Nonetheless, the campaign was successful as brotherly cooperation between the Croats and the Slovaks brought its fruit throughout the war. Most of the battles between Slovaks and Hungarians however, did not turn out in favor for the Slovaks who were logistically supported by the Austrians, but not sufficiently. The shortage of manpower proved to be decisive as well.

During the war, the Slovak National Council brought its demands to the young Austrian Emperor, Franz Joseph I, who seemed to take a note of it and promised support for the Slovaks against the revolutionary radical Hungarians. However the moment the revolution was over, Slovak demands were forgotten. These demands included an autonomous land within the Austrian Empire called "Slovenský kraj" which would be eventually led by a Serbian prince. This act of ignorance from the Emperor convinced the Slovak and the Czech elite who proclaimed the concept of Austroslavism as dead.

Disgusted by the Emperor's policy, in 1849, Ľudovít Štúr, the person who codified the first official Slovak language, wrote a book he would name Slavdom and the World of the Future. This book served as a manifesto where he noted that Austroslavism was not the way to go anymore. He also wrote a sentence that often serves as a quote until this day: "Every nation has its time under God's sun, and the linden [a symbol of the Slavs] is blossoming, while the oak [a symbol of the Teutons] bloomed long ago."

He expressed confidence in the Russian Empire however, as it was the only country of Slavs that was not dominated by anybody else, yet it was one of the most powerful nations in the world. He often symbolized Slavs as being a tree, with "minor" Slavic nations being branches while the trunk of the tree was Russian. His Pan-Slavic views were unleashed in this book, where he stated that the land of Slovaks should be annexed by the Tsar's empire and that eventually, the population could be not only Russified, but also converted into the rite of Orthodoxy, religion originally spread by Cyril and Methodius during the times of Great Moravia, which served as an opposition to the Catholic missionaries from the Franks. After the Hungarian invasion of Pannonia, Hungarians converted into Catholicism, which effectively influenced the Slavs living in Pannonia and in the land south of the Lechs.

However, the Russian Empire often claimed Pan-Slavism as a justification for its aggressive moves in the Balkan Peninsula of Europe against the Ottoman Empire, which conquered and held the land of Slavs for centuries. This eventually led to the Balkan campaign of the Russian Empire, which resulted in the entire Balkan being liberated from the Ottoman Empire, with the help and the initiative of the Russian Empire. Pan-Slavism has some supporters among Czech and Slovak politicians, especially among the nationalistic and far-right ones, such as People's Party – Our Slovakia.

During World War I, captured Slavic soldiers were asked to fight against "oppression in the Austrian Empire". Consequently, some did. (see Czechoslovak Legions)

The creation of an independent Czechoslovakia made the old ideals of Pan-Slavism anachronistic. Relations with other Slavic states varied, sometimes being so tense it escalated into an armed conflict, such as with the Second Polish Republic where border clashes over Silesia resulted in a short hostile conflict, the Polish–Czechoslovak War. Even tensions between Czechs and Slovaks had appeared before and during World War II.

Pan-Slavism among South Slavs 

Pan-Slavism in the south, largely advocated by Serbs, would often turn to Russia for support. The Southern Slavic movement advocated the independence of the Slavic peoples in the Austro-Hungarian Empire, Republic of Venice and the Ottoman Empire. Most Serbian intellectuals sought to unite all of the Southern, Balkan Slavs, whether Catholic (Croats, Slovenes), Muslim (Bosniaks, Pomaks), or Orthodox (Serbs, Macedonians, Bulgarians) as a "Southern-Slavic nation of three faiths".

Austria feared that Pan-Slavists would endanger the empire. In Austria-Hungary Southern Slavs were distributed among several entities: Slovenes in the Austrian part (Carniola, Styria, Carinthia, Gorizia and Gradisca, Trieste, Istria), Croats and Serbs in the Hungarian part within the autonomous Kingdom of Croatia-Slavonia and in the Austrian part within the autonomous Kingdom of Dalmatia, and in Bosnia and Herzegovina, under direct control from Vienna. Owing to a different position within Austria-Hungary, several different goals were prominent among the Southern Slavs of Austria-Hungary. A strong alternative to Pan-Slavism was Austroslavism, especially among the Croats and Slovenes. Because the Serbs were dispersed among several regions, and the fact that they had ties to the independent nation state of Kingdom of Serbia, they were among the strongest supporters of independence of South-Slavs from Austria-Hungary and uniting into a common state under Serbian monarchy.

In 1863, the Association of Serbian Philology commemorated the death of Cyril a thousand years earlier, its president Dimitrije Matić, talked of the creation of an ethnically "pure" Slavonic people: "with God’s help, there should be a whole Slavonic people with purely Slavonic faces and of purely Slavonic character"

After World War I the creation of the Kingdom of Yugoslavia, under Serbian royalty of the Karađorđević dynasty, united most Southern Slavic-speaking nations regardless of religion and cultural background. The only ones they did not unite with were the Bulgarians. Still, in the years after the Second World War, there were proposals to incorporate Bulgaria into a Greater Yugoslavia thus uniting all south Slavic-speaking nations into one state. The idea was abandoned after the split between Josip Broz Tito and Joseph Stalin in 1948. This led to some bitter sentiment between the people of Yugoslavia and Bulgaria in the aftermath.

At the end of the Second World War, the Partisans' mixed heritage leader Josip Broz Tito became Yugoslav president, and the country become a socialist republic, with the motto of "Brotherhood and Unity" between its various Slavic peoples.

Pan-Slavism in Poland 

With the exception of Russia, the Polish nation has the distinction among other Slavic peoples of having enjoyed independence as a part of various entities for several centuries prior to the advent of Pan-Slavism.

After 1795, Revolutionary and Napoleonic France had influenced many Poles who sought the reconstitution of their existing country—particularly since France was a mutual enemy of Austria, Prussia, and also Russia. Russia's Pan-Slavic rhetoric had alarmed the Poles. Pan-Slavism was not fully embraced among Poles after the early period. Poland did nevertheless express solidarity with those of its fellow Slavic nations that had suffered oppression and were seeking independence.

While Pan-Slavism as an ideology was inimical to Austro-Hungarian interests, Poles instead embraced the wide autonomy within the state and assumed a loyalist position towards the Habsburgs. Within the Austro-Hungarian polity, they were able to develop their national culture and preserve the Polish language, both of which were under threat in both German and Russian Empires. A Pan-Slavic federation was proposed, but on the condition that the Russian Empire would be excluded from such an entity. After Poland regained its independence (from Germany, Austria and Russia) in 1918, no internal faction considered Pan-Slavism as an alternative, viewing Pan-Slavism as Russification. During Poland's communist era, the USSR used Pan-Slavism as a propaganda tool to justify its control over the country. The issue of Pan-Slavism was not part of current mainstream politics and is widely seen as an ideology of Russian imperialism.

Pan-Slavism in Russia 

During the time of the Soviet Union, Bolshevik teachings viewed Pan-Slavism as a reactionary element which was formerly used by the Russian Empire. As a result, Bolsheviks viewed it as contrary to their Marxist ideology. Panslavists even faced persecution during the Stalinist repressions in the Soviet Union (see Slavists case). Nowadays, ultranationalist parties like the Russian National Unity party advocate for a Russian-dominated Slavic Union, although this type of irredentism became mainstream with Putinism and Rashism, with the government repeatedly calling for expansionism in speeches, embracing irredentist concepts including Moldova, Ukraine and other slavic NATO members.

Modern-day developments 

The authentic idea of the unity of the Slavic people was all but gone after World War I when the maxim "Versailles and Trianon have put an end to all Slavisms" and was largely put to rest with the fall of communism in Central and Eastern Europe in the late 1980s, leading to the breakup of federal states such as Czechoslovakia and Yugoslavia.
Varying relations between the Slavic countries exist nowadays; they range from mutual respect on equal footing and sympathy towards one another through traditional dislike and enmity, to indifference. No forms, other than culture and heritage oriented organizations, are currently considered forms of rapprochement among the countries with Slavic origins. The political parties which include Pan-Slavism as part of their program usually live on the fringe of the political spectrum, or are part of controlled and systemic opposition in Belarus, Russia and occupied territories, as part of an irredentist pan-slavist campaign by Russia.

A political concept of Euro-Slavism evolved from the idea that European integration will solve issues of Slavic peoples and promote peace, unity and cooperation on equal terms within the European Union. The concept seeks to resist strong multicultural tendencies from Western Europe, the dominant position of Germany, opposes Slavophilia, and typically encourages democracy and democratic values. Many Euroslavists believe it is possible to unite Slavic communities without exclusion of Russia from the European cultural area, but are also opposed to Russophilia and concepts of Slavs under Russian domination and irredentism. It is considered a modern form of Austro-Slavist and Neo-Slavist movements. Their origins date back to the middle of the 19th century, being first proposed by Czech liberal politician Karel Havlíček Borovský in 1846, when it was refined into a provisional political program by Czech politician František Palacký and completed by the first President of Czechoslovakia Tomáš Garrigue Masaryk in his work New Europe: Slavic Viewpoint.

Creation of Pan-Slavic languages 
Similarities of Slavic languages inspired many to create zonal auxiliary Pan-Slavic languages for all Slavic people to communicate with one another. Several such languages were constructed in the past, but many more were created in the Internet Age. The most prominent modern example is Interslavic.

See also

 Neo-Slavism
 Pan-Africanism
 Pan-Arabism
 Pan-Asianism
 Pan-Germanism
 Pan-Turkism
 Russophilia
 Slavophilia

References

Further reading
 Kohn, Hans. Nationalism: Its meaning and history (van Nostrand, 1955).
 
 Petrovich B.M. The Emergence of Russian Panslavism, 1856-1870 (Columbia University Press, 1956)
 Kostya S. Pan-Slavism (Danubian Press, 1981)
 Golub I., Bracewell C. The Slavic Idea of  Juraj Krizanic, Harvard Ukrainian Studies 3-4 (1986).
 Tobolka Z. Der Panslavismus, Zeitschrift fur Politik, 6 (1913)
 Gasor A., Karl L., Troebst S. (eds.) Post-Panslavismus. Slavizitat, Slavische Idee und Antislavismus im 20. und 21. Jahrhundert (Wallstein Verlag, 2014)
 Agnew H. Origins of the Czech National Renascence (University of Pittsburgh Press, 1993)
 Carole R. The Slovenes and Yugoslavism, 1890-1914 (Columbia University Press, 1977)
 Abbott G. European and Muscovite: Ivan Kireevsky and the origins of Slavophilism (Cambridge University Press, 1972)
 Djokic D. (ed.) Yugoslavism. Histories of a Failed Idea, 1918-1992 (Hurst and Company, 2003)
 Snyder, Louis L. Encyclopedia of Nationalism (1990) pp 309–315.
 Vyšný, Paul. Neo-Slavism and the Czechs, 1898-1914 (Cambridge University Press, 1977).
 
 "Pan-Slavism" in Columbia Encyclopedia

External links

 
Slavism
Political theories
Russophile Movement in Western Ukraine
Foreign relations of the Russian Empire
Slavicization
Russification
Political ideologies
Russian nationalism
Russian philosophy